Jang Heunghyo (1564–1633) was one of the principal scholars of Neo-Confucianism in Korea in the early 17th century, active in the Gyeongbuk province.
He was one of the main representatives of the second generation of scholars of the Toegye school.
His life and the development of his philosophy are well-documented thanks to his lifelong practice of keeping a diary.

References

Jang Yunsu (장윤수), "Study on the Gyeong-Dang-Diary and Neo-Confucianism in the northern district of Kyeong-Buk in the 17th century" (2008) (scholar.dkyobobook.co.kr)

See also
Jang Hyeongwang
List of Korean philosophers

1564 births
1633 deaths
16th-century Korean writers
17th-century Korean writers
Korean Confucianists
Neo-Confucian scholars
People from Andong
17th-century Korean philosophers